This is a list of lighthouses in Papua New Guinea.

Lighthouses

See also
 Lists of lighthouses and lightvessels

References

External links
 

Papua New Guinea
Lighthouses
Lighthouses